Shades of Truth is an Italian movie, created and directed by Liana Marabini in 2015, about the life of Pope Pius XII and his relation with Nazi Germany. Its world premiere took place at the Vatican City on March 2, 2015, marking the anniversary of the birth of Eugenio Pacelli in 1876 and his appointment as Pope Pius XII in 1939. It was released in movie theaters all over the world in April 2015 and screened at the Cannes Film Festival in May of the same year. According to the director, Liana Marabini, Pope Piux XII saved at least 800,000 Jews.

Cast
 David Wall as David Milano
 Gedeon Burkhard
 Jennifer Mischiati as Sarah
 Remo Girone
 Giancarlo Giannini as Aaron Azulai
 Marie-Christine Barrault as Sister Maria Angelica
 Christopher Lambert as Cardinal Ennio Salvemini

References

External links
 

2015 films
Italian historical drama films
Cultural depictions of Pope Pius XII
2010s Italian films